Sayyid Kastir Gul (1573-1653) also known as Sheikh Al-Mashaikh Sheikh Rahmakar alias Kaka Sahib, was an Islamic jurist and Sufi saint of the 16th and 17th centuries who is still highly revered among Afghans and Pakistanis. He is the patriarch of the Pashtun Kakakhel tribe, which is distinguished from other Pashtun tribes by its descendants to the Prophet Muhammad.

Birth 
Sheikh Rahmakar was born on Friday evening, December 25, 1573, in Kandakhel, Kohsar, Nowshera in present-day Pakistan.

Name and ancestry 
His name is Syed Kastir Gul. He is a descendant of Prophet Muhammad, in the 25th generations. His grandfather was a revered saint among the Pashtuns named Mast Baba, whose shrine is located seven miles away from his own shrine in Nowshera. Even though his title was "Sheikh Al-Mashaikh, which means "teacher of all teachers," he is known by the alias "Kaka Sahib."

Biography and character 
He is known to this day as an epitome of Islamic asceticism (in Arabic, "Zuhd"), who was very conspicuous among clerics during his lifetime because of his regular voluntary fasting. Furthermore, he is known for his ascetic sermons, which included the importance of nightly prayer ("Tahajjud"), as well as character patterns such as decency ("Sharafat"), qualitative modesty ("Faqr"), generosity ("Karam"), and empathy ("Rahm") toward fellow human beings. His empathy and fame due to his philanthropic projects cleared him the title of "Rahamkar" (in English: "Benefactor"). His philanthropic projects were especially those aimed at improving the quality of living conditions.

He founded several educational institutions where he and his graduate students taught Islamic law ("Fiqh"), history ("Tarikh") philosophy ("Kalam") and mysticism ("Tasawuf").

He enjoyed a high reputation among many contemporary scholars because of his religious activities. One Sufi healer with whom he is said to have had a very close friendship was Sayyid Khwaja Khawand Mahmud, the contemporary head of the Naqshbandi Sufi order, also known as Hazrat Ishaan.

Order affiliation 
Similar to the patron saint of Kashmiri society in Srinagar named Moinuddin Hadi Naqshband, who is a central primary source of his father Khwaja Khawand Mahmud's life, Sayyid Kastir Gul's son Mian Abdul Haleem is also a central reference who narrates his father's life. The latter emphasized his father's affiliation with the Suhrawardi Sufi Order, which was founded by Shahabuddin Suhrawardi to which Jalaluddin Surkh Push Bukhari also belonged.

Descendants 
Sayyid Kastir Gul had five children and is considered the patriarch of the Kakakhel tribe known today. The Kakakhel tribe enjoys great prestige in the Pakistani politics to this day, whose members are particularly known as high-ranking civil servants, Attorneys, and clerics.

Historically, the Kakakhel tribe played a central role in the defense of the Emirate of Afghanistan against the Sikh from 1751-1837 like in the battle of Nowshera. Due to the legendary friendship of Sayyid Kastir Gul and Sayyid Khwaja Khawand Mahmud, the descendants of both Saints are very close.

Silsila 
In his diploma, the following line of accreditation (also known as "Silsila") is mentioned up to Muhammad, which affirms his affiliation with the Sunni Suhrawardi Order:

  Kastir Gul alias Rahmakar Baba.
  HBahadur Baba
  HNadir Baba alias Mast Baba
  HAbdul Qudoos Nomani Gangohi
  Burhanuddin Muhammad Darwish Odhi
  Badhan Baraichi
  Ajmal Baraichi
  Jalaluddin Surkh-Posh Bukhari
  Abul Fateh Rukn-ud-Din Multani
  Sadruddin Arif Multani
  Bahauddin Zakaria Multani
  Shihab al-Din 'Umar al-Suhrawardi
  Abu al-Najib Suhrawardi
  Abu Ahmad Ghazali
  Abu Bakr Nisaj
  Abul Qasim Gurgani
  Abu Usman Maghribi
  Abu Ali Katib
  Ahmad Abu Ali Rudbari
  Junayd of Baghdad
  Sari al-Saqati
  Ma'ruf al-Karkhi
  Hasan al-Askari
  Ali al-Hadi
  Muhammad al-Jawad
  Ali al-Rida
  Musa al-Kazim
  Ja'far al-Sadiq
  Muhammad al-Baqir
  Ali ibn Husayn Zayn al-Abidin
  Husayn ibn Ali
  Hasan ibn Ali
  Ali
  Muhammad

Caliphs 
He had a high number of graduates in Islamic law due to his educational projects, including caliphs who were masters of knowledge, poverty and miracles. Among his students was the Afghan poet Khushal Khan Khattak.

Death 

Sayyid Kastir Guil died, according to the Islamic lunar calendar, on Friday June 20, 1653. In Pashtun circles, his effort to perform prayers ("salat") in his last moments, where he was to depend on the assistance of two of his children, is highlighted to this day.

References

Lierature 
 "Haleem Gul Baba," an article written by Pir Sabaq in the journal Qudsia, from the publishing house Darul Uloom Faiz-ul-Quran in Nowshera.
 "Tazkira Ulema wa Mashaikh Sarhad" (German: Verzeichnis hochgeachteter Kleriker) Volume I, written by Muhammad Amir Shah Qadri, Maktab-ul-Hasan Kocha Aqa Pir Jan Yaka Tut in Peshawar.
 Yasin Kaswari: . Edited by Edare Talimat Naskhbandi Lahore/Foundation for Nakshbandi Teachings Lahore. Edare Talimat Naskhbandi Lahore (Foundation for Nakshbandi Teachings Lahore), Lahore, Pakistan 1992.

17th-century Muslim scholars of Islam
Family of Muhammad
Hashemite people
Sufi religious leaders
Sufi saints
Sunni Sufis
Naqshbandi order
Sufi mystics
1573 births
1653 deaths
People of Arab descent